Ukraine, an important republic of the former Union of Socialist Soviet Republics (USSR) from 1922–91, once hosted Soviet nuclear weapons and delivery systems on its territory. Together with Russia, Ukraine was a part of the former Soviet Union but its population voted overwhelmingly for independence in 1991, which ended any realistic chance of the Soviet Union staying together even on a limited scale.

The Ukrainian declaration of independence was supported by more than 90% of the electorates who appointed Leonid Kravchuk, the-chairman of the parliament, as the first president of the country. At the meetings in Brest on December 8, and in Alma Ata on December 21, the presidents of Belarus, Russia, and Ukraine formally dissolved the Soviet Union and formed the Commonwealth of Independent States (CIS).

The former Soviet Union had its nuclear program expanded to only four of its republics: Belarus, Kazakhstan, Russia, and Ukraine. After its dissolution in 1991, Ukraine became the third largest nuclear power in the world and held about one third of the former Soviet nuclear weapons, delivery system, and significant means of its design, knowledge, and production. Ukraine inherited about 130 UR-100N intercontinental ballistic missiles (ICBM) with six warheads each, 46 RT-23 Molodets ICBMs with ten warheads apiece, as well as 33 heavy bombers, totaling approximately 1,700 nuclear warheads remained on Ukrainian territory.

Formally, these weapons were controlled by the Commonwealth of Independent States, specifically by Russia, which had the launch sequence and operational control of the nuclear warheads and its weapons system. In 1994, Ukraine, citing its inability to circumvent Russian launch codes, reached an understanding to transfer and destroy these weapons, and become a party to the Treaty on the Non-Proliferation of Nuclear Weapons (NPT).

Former military units

As a republic in the Soviet Union, Ukraine was the base for the following nuclear forces:
 43rd Rocket Army
19th Rocket Division (Rakovo, Khmelnytskyi Oblast) (see :uk:19-та ракетна дивізія (СРСР))
37th Guards Rocket Division (Lutsk, Volyn Oblast)
43rd Guards Rocket Division (Romny, Sumy Oblast)
46th Rocket Division (Pervomaisk, Nikolayev Oblast)
50th Rocket Division (Bilokorovychi, Zhitomir Oblast)

Denuclearization 
In 1993, international relations theorist and University of Chicago professor John Mearsheimer published an article including his prediction that a Ukraine without any nuclear deterrent was likely to be subjected to aggression by Russia, but this was very much a minority view at the time.

A study published in 2016 in the journal World Affairs argued that, in the opinion of the authors, the denuclearization of Ukraine was not a "stupid mistake", and that it is unclear that Ukraine would be better off as a nuclear state. The study argued that the push for Ukrainian independence was with a view to make it a nonnuclear state. According to the authors, the United States would also not have made Ukraine an exception when it came to the denuclearization of other post-Soviet states such as Belarus and Kazakhstan.

The deterrent value of the nuclear weapons in Ukraine was also questionable: Ukraine had taken "administrative control" of the weapon delivery systems and implemented measures to prevent Russia from using them, but would have had to spend 12 to 18 months to establish full operational control over its nuclear arsenal. The ICBMs also had a range of 5,000–10,000 km (initially targeting the United States), which meant that they could only have been re-targeted to hit Russia's far east. The Soviet air-launched cruise missiles (ALCMs) had been disabled by the Russian military during the collapse of the Soviet Union, but even if they had been reconfigured and made to work by the Ukrainians, it is unlikely that they would have had a deterrent effect. Had Ukraine decided to establish full operational control of its nuclear weapons, it would have faced sanctions by the West and perhaps even a withdrawal of diplomatic recognition by the United States and other NATO allies. Ukraine would also likely have faced retaliatory action by Russia. Ukraine would also have struggled with replacing the nuclear weapons once their service life expired, as Ukraine did not have a nuclear weapons program. In exchange for giving up its nuclear weapons, Ukraine received financial compensation, as well as the security assurances of the Budapest Memorandum.

Budapest Memorandum 

On December 5, 1994 the leaders of Ukraine, Russia, Britain, and the United States signed a memorandum to provide Ukraine with security assurances in connection with its accession to the NPT as a non-nuclear weapon state. The four parties signed the memorandum, containing a preamble and six paragraphs. The memorandum reads as follows:

France and China's commitments
France and China also provided Ukraine with assurances similar to the Budapest Memorandum, but with some significant differences. For instance, France's pledge does not contain the promises laid out in paragraphs 4 and 6 above, to refer any aggression to the UN Security Council, nor to consult in the event of a question regarding the commitments.

China's pledge takes a different form entirely, dating from December 4, and reading as follows:

 The Chinese Government welcomes the decision of Ukraine to destroy all nuclear weapons on its territory, and commends the approval by the Verkhovna Rada of Ukraine on November 16 of Ukraine’s accession to the Treaty on the Non-Proliferation of Nuclear Weapons as a non-nuclear-weapon State. China fully understands the desire of Ukraine for security assurance. The Chinese Government has always maintained that under no circumstances will China use or threaten to use nuclear weapons against non-nuclear-weapon States or nuclear-weapon-free zones. This principled position also applies to Ukraine. The Chinese Government urges all other nuclear-weapon States to undertake the same commitment, so as to enhance the security of all non-nuclear-weapon States, including Ukraine.
 The Chinese Government has constantly opposed the practice of exerting political, economic, or other pressure in international relations. It maintains that disputes and differences should be settled peacefully through consultations on an equal footing. Abiding by the spirit of the Sino-Ukrainian joint communiqué of January 4, 1992 on the establishment of diplomatic relations, the Sino-Ukrainian joint communiqué of October 31, 1992 and the Sino-Ukrainian joint statement of September 6, 1994, China recognizes and respects the independence, sovereignty and territorial integrity of Ukraine, and stands ready to further develop friendly and cooperative Sino-Ukraine relations on the basis of the Five Principles of Peaceful Coexistence.

Thus, China's pledge, similar to France's, does not pledge to involve UN or consultative mechanisms in case of crisis. However, it does pledge to respect the sovereignty and territorial integrity of Ukraine.

Removal of Soviet nuclear weapons 
Russian forces withdrew nuclear weapons and delivery systems from the Crimean peninsula after the dissolution of the Soviet Union, in the mid-1990s, with the exception of some nuclear-capable ships and submarines of the Black Sea Fleet stationed in accordance with agreements with Ukraine. After the 2014 annexation, the Russian Federation again deployed nuclear-capable weapons to the peninsula, including S-300 antiaircraft missiles, and later Tu-22M3 Backfire bombers and Iskander-M ballistic missiles. In 2020, a Ukrainian NSDC official stated that Russia had done work on Soviet nuclear-weapons storage facility Feodosiia-13 in Krasnokamianka (Kyzyltash), and had added new tunnels to a nuclear submarine base at Balaklava.

2014 annexation of Crimea
Despite Russia's claimed annexation of Crimea, which the UN General Assembly rejected as invalid, the Government of Ukraine in 2014 reaffirmed its 1994 decision to accede to the Nuclear Non-Proliferation Treaty as a non-nuclear-weapon state.

Pavlo Rizanenko, a member of the Ukrainian parliament, told USA Today that Ukraine may have to arm themselves with their own nuclear weapons if the United States and other world leaders do not hold up their end of the agreement. He said, "We gave up nuclear weapons because of this agreement. Now, there's a strong sentiment in Ukraine that we made a big mistake." He also said that, "In the future, no matter how the situation is resolved in Crimea, we need a much stronger Ukraine. If you have nuclear weapons, people don't invade you." On December 13, 2014 Ukrainian President Petro Poroshenko stated that he did not want Ukraine to become a nuclear power again.

In July 2014, Russian Foreign Minister Sergey Lavrov stated that his country had the right to defend Crimea using nuclear weapons, and in March 2015 president Putin said that during the invasion of Crimea he had been prepared to put nuclear forces on alert. Around the same time, a Russian foreign ministry official said that Russia had the right to deploy nuclear arms to the peninsula, which is internationally recognized as Ukrainian territory.

2021–2022 renewed tensions with Russia
On April 15, 2021, Ukrainian Ambassador to Germany Andriy Yaroslavovych Melnyk told Deutschlandfunk radio that if Ukraine was not allowed to become a NATO member, his country might have to reconsider its status as a non-nuclear weapon state to guarantee its defense.

In February 2022, during the Russian invasion of Ukraine, Ukrainian president Volodymyr Zelensky renewed such sentiments, suggesting that Ukraine would potentially view the Budapest Memorandum as invalid should its security assurances not be met.

Bioweapons conspiracy theory

Politics
As of 2022 only three Ukrainian parties support bringing back nuclear weapons: Svoboda, Radical Party of Oleh Liashko, and the National Corps.

Reference list

Further reading
 Kostenko, Y., & D’Anieri, P. (2021). Ukraine’s Nuclear Disarmament: A History (S. Krasynska, L. Wolanskyj, & O. Jennings, Trans.). Cambridge: Harvard Ukrainian Research Institute.

External links
 The Ukraine Crisis is Unsettling Decades-old Nuclear Weapons Agreements
 Ukraine Votes to Quit Soviet Union : Independence: More than 90% of Voters Approve Historic Break with Kremlin. The President-elect Calls for Collective Command of the Country's Nuclear Arsenal
 Russia, Ukraine, and the Breakup of the Soviet Union
 Memorandums on Security Assurances, 1994
 Ukraine May Have to Go Nuclear, Says Kiev LawmakerThe Ukraine Crisis Is Unsettling Decades-Old Nuclear-Weapons Agreements 
 The Militarization of Crimea as a Pan-European Threat and NATO Response. Third Edition

Weapons of mass destruction
Mass destruction
Nuclear weapons program of the Soviet Union
Weapons of mass destruction
Ukraine